was a Japanese anthropologist and folklorist known for his studies in Taiwanese indigenous peoples.

Biography
Inō was born in what is now part of the city of Tōno, Iwate, Japan. He moved to Tokyo in 1885 and was active in the Freedom and People's Rights Movement. He later worked as a journalist and for a printing company before becoming a pupil of the noted professor of biological anthropology, Tsuboi Shogoro at Tokyo Imperial University in 1893, along with Torii Ryūzō. Following the acquisition of Taiwan by the Empire of Japan following the First Sino-Japanese War in 1895, he received permission from the Governor-General of Taiwan to conduct research there. He remained in Taiwan to 1906, publishing several works on the culture of the Taiwanese aborigines.

In The Island of Formosa (1903), former US Consul to Formosa James W. Davidson presented the first English-language account of the aborigines of the whole island, which was almost entirely based on the comprehensive work collected over several years of study by Ino, the foremost authority on the topic at the time. In his book, Davidson presented Ino's formalization of eight tribes of Taiwanese aborigines: Atayal, Vonum, Tsou, Tsalisen, Paiwan, Puyuma, Ami and Pepo.

Inō returned to his native Tōno in 1905 and pursued cultural and folklore studies there, together with Kizen Sasaki. He became acquainted with Kunio Yanagita, who was also collecting the oral traditions and tales in preparation of his  Tōno Monogatari. He died in 1925, due to complication from malaria contracted while he was living in Taiwan.

Bibliography

See also
Torii Ryūzō

References

Japanese anthropologists
Japanese archaeologists
Japanese folklorists
1867 births
1925 deaths
People from Iwate Prefecture
Taiwanese aboriginal culture and history
Taiwanese aboriginal anthropologists
Deaths from malaria
Infectious disease deaths in Japan